Lease and release is literally the lease (tenancy) of non-tenanted property by its owner followed by a release (relinquishment) of the landlord's interest in the property.  This sequence of transactions was commonly used to transfer full title to real estate under real property law.  Lease and release was a mode of conveyance of freehold estates formerly common in England and in New York for tax avoidance and speed.  Between its parties it achieves the same outcome as a deed of grant/transfer/conveyance.

History
Lease and release was:
"a species of conveyance, invented by Serjeant Moore, soon after the enactment of the statute of uses. It is thus contrived; a lease, in fact being a bargain and sale upon some pecuniary consideration for one year, is made by a tenant of the whole freehold [with no fetter on alienation] to the lessee who is in fact the bargainee (buyer). This, without any enrollment, makes the bargainor stand seised to the use of the bargainee, and vests in the bargainee the use of the term for one year, and then the statute immediately annexes the possession. Being thus in possession, he is capable of receiving a release of the freehold and reversion, made to this tenant (bargainee) in possession; and, accordingly, the next day a release is granted to him."
 This cites the New York common law treatise that "lease and release was the usual mode of conveyance in England (until) 1841 ... and in New York until 1788...."  The original benefactor was Lord Norris, "to avoid the unpleasant notoriety of a livery or attornment."

A "special form of grant called a release [can] used to convey a future interest [reversion] to someone who already has a current interest.  (A later alternative name is quitclaim.)  This fact resulted in a very popular form of conveyance called a lease and release.  Two agreements were required.  First, a bargain (sale) contract was executed by the seller to convey a lease on the land...(Unlike an outright sale, short leases did not require enrollment in a public registry.)  The seller then separately executed a release to grant to the buyer (who was now his tenant) the seller’s remaining interest.  [This transfers] title to the buyer, since he now owned both the current and future interests in the land."

The lease and release was:
"developed as another strategy to avoid public transfer of seisin, in response to the limitations imposed by the Statute of Enrolments. Since uses (future leases in land) had been limited by the Statute of Uses (and remain subject to disincentives in many jurisdictions), another instrument had to be found. That instrument was the lease for a year (lease for possession) followed on the following day by a release of the property, thus avoiding livery of seisin. The instrument thus consists of two parts: (i) a lease for one year on one day; (ii) a release on the following day. In the lease for a year, the consideration was nominal (usually 5s.) and the term of the lease one year. The release was executed the day after the lease, releasing the property to the 'lessee' in perpetuity; the full purchase price (consideration) is recited in the release; the release recites [mentions] the lease of the previous day; the release is executed 'according to the statute for converting uses into possession' (the Statute of Uses)."

In shorter form it has been described as:
"the most common method of conveying freehold property from the later seventeenth century onwards, before the introduction of the modern conveyance in the late nineteenth century. The lease was granted for a year (sometimes six months), then on the following day the lessor released their right of ownership in return for the consideration."

This was a wordy, sometimes two document, mode of conveyance of freehold estates, formerly common in England and in New York superseded by a simple deed of grant/transfer.

References

See also
Conveyance
Deed
Fee
Freehold

Real property law
Legal history of England
Legal history of New York (state)